Paso Real Formation may refer to:
 Paso Real Formation, Costa Rica, a Late Pliocene to Early Pleistocene geologic formation in Costa Rica
 Paso Real Formation, Cuba, an Early Miocene geologic formation in Cuba